Kuzhenkino is an urban-type settlement in Bologovsky District of Tver Oblast, Russia. Population:  It is located on the north of the oblast, close to the border with Novgorod Oblast.

History
In 1907, Bologoye - Polotsk Railway was opened, and Kuzhenkino became one of the original stations of the railway. At the time, it belonged to Valdaysky Uyezd of Novgorod Governorate. In August 1927, the governorates and uyezds were abolished. Bologovsky District, with the administrative center in the town of Bologoye, was established within Borovichi Okrug of Leningrad Oblast effective October 1, 1927. It included parts of former Valdaysky Uyezd. Kuzhenkino became a part of the district. On July 23, 1930, the okrugs were abolished, and the districts were directly subordinated to the oblast. On January 29, 1935 Bologovsky District was transferred to newly established Kalinin Oblast. 

In 1939, Kuzhenkino was granted urban-type settlement status. In 1990, Kalinin Oblast was renamed Tver Oblast.

Economy

Transportation

Kuzhenkino is located on the railway line which connects Bologoye with Velikiye Luki via Andreapol. There is infrequent passenger traffic along the line.

The M10 highway, which connects Moscow and St. Petersburg, passes just north of Kuzhenkino.

References

Notes

Sources

Urban-type settlements in Tver Oblast
Valdaysky Uyezd